During the 1982–83 English football season, Brentford competed in the Football League Third Division. The high point of a mid-table season was a run to the fourth round of the League Cup, then the furthest the club had then progressed in the competition. The 107 goals scored during the season is a club record.

Season summary 
After many failed attempts, Brentford manager Fred Callaghan finally signed what would prove to be a potent strike partnership during the 1982 off-season – Francis Joseph from Wimbledon and Tony Mahoney from Fulham. Goalkeeper David McKellar's contract was terminated after a serious breach of club discipline and he was replaced by former Chelsea goalkeeper Petar Borota. Barota only appeared in three Football League Group Cup fixtures before being in turn replaced by Paddy Roche. The defensive ranks were cleared out, with Pat Kruse, Mark Hill, Robbie Johnson, Paul Shrubb and Kevin Teer all released. Experienced former Chelsea defender Graham Wilkins arrived on a free transfer.

Brentford had a busy first half of the season, reaching the fourth round of the League Cup for the first time in club history. Higher-division clubs Blackburn Rovers and Swansea City were knocked out in the second and third rounds before the Bees fell to First Division club Nottingham Forest at the City Ground. Brentford advanced to the second round of the FA Cup, before suffering a disappointing replay defeat to Fourth Division club Swindon Town. Forward Tony Mahoney, who had up until that point scored 15 goals in 28 appearances, broke his leg in three places during the defeat.

Despite heavy scoring from forwards Francis Joseph, Tony Mahoney and winger Gary Roberts early season, Brentford's league form was patchy mid-season. 10 defeats from 14 matches between late December 1982 and early March 1983 ultimately killed hopes of a promotion challenge. Manager Fred Callaghan signed Southampton forward Keith Cassells in a bid to replace Tony Mahoney's goals and while there was an upturn in form during the final two months of the season, Brentford finished in 9th place. The Bees finished the season with the best overall and best away attacking records in the Third Division.

Four club records were set or equalled during the season:
 Most goals scored in a season (all competitions): 107
 Record Football League away win: 7–1 versus Exeter City, 23 April 1983
 Most goals scored in an away Football League win: 7 (7–1 versus Exeter City, 23 April 1983)
 Three goalscorers with 10 or more goals by Christmas Day (all competitions): Francis Joseph, Gary Roberts, Tony Mahoney

League table

Results
Brentford's goal tally listed first.

Legend

Pre-season and friendlies

Football League Third Division

FA Cup

Football League Cup

Football League Group Cup 

 Sources: 100 Years of Brentford, The Big Brentford Book of the Eighties,Croxford, Lane & Waterman, p. 392-393. Statto

Playing squad 
Players' ages are as of the opening day of the 1982–83 season.

 Sources: The Big Brentford Book of the Eighties, Timeless Bees

Coaching staff

Statistics

Appearances and goals
Substitute appearances in brackets.

Players listed in italics left the club mid-season.
Football League Group Cup appearances and goals are not included in overall player totals.
Source: The Big Brentford Book of the Eighties

Goalscorers 

Players listed in italics left the club mid-season.
Football League Group Cup appearances and goals are not included in overall player totals.
Source: The Big Brentford Book of the Eighties

Management

Summary

Transfers & loans

Awards 
 Supporters' Player of the Year: Bob Booker
 Players' Player of the Year: Bob Booker

Notes

References 

Brentford F.C. seasons
Brentford